The brown hyena (Parahyaena brunnea), also called strandwolf, is a species of hyena found in Namibia, Botswana, western and southern Zimbabwe, southern Mozambique and South Africa. It is the only extant species in the genus Parahyaena. It is currently the rarest species of hyena. The largest remaining brown hyena population is located in the southern Kalahari Desert and coastal areas in Southwest Africa. The global population of brown hyena is estimated by IUCN at a number between 4,000 and 10,000 and its conservation status is marked as near threatened in the IUCN Red List.

Description

Brown hyenas are distinguished from other species by their long shaggy dark brown coat, pointed ears, and short tail. Their legs are striped brown and white, and adults have a distinct cream-colored fur ruff around their necks. Unlike the larger spotted hyena, there are no sizable differences between the sexes, although males may be slightly larger than females. An average adult male weighs , while an average female weighs . Brown hyenas have powerful jaws, and young animals can crack the leg bones of springboks in five minutes, though this ability deteriorates with age and dental wear. The skulls of brown hyenas are larger than those of the closely related striped hyena, and their dentition is more robust, indicating a less generalized dietary adaptation.

Distribution and habitat 
Today, the brown hyena only inhabits Southern Africa, but in the past it lived also in the Iberian Peninsula and perhaps in other parts of Europe, indicated by fossils found in the area of Granada from the Upper Pliocene. It inhabits desert areas, semi-desert, and open woodland savannahs. It can survive close to urban areas by scavenging. The brown hyena is not dependent on the ready availability of water sources for frequent drinking and favors rocky, mountainous areas, as these provide shade.

Ecology and behavior
In the Kalahari, 80% of a brown hyena's activity time is spent at night, searching for food in an area on spanning  on average, with territories of  having been recorded. They may cache excess food in shrubs or holes and recover it within 24 hours.

Social behavior
Brown hyenas have a social hierarchy comparable to that of wolves, with a mated pair and their offspring. They live in clans composed of extended families of four to six individuals. Clans defend their territory, and all members cooperate in raising cubs. Territories are marked by 'pasting', during which the hyena deposits secretions from its large anal gland, which is located below the base of the tail and produces a black and white paste, on vegetation and boulders. Brown hyenas maintain a stable clan hierarchy through ritualized aggressive displays and mock fights. A brown hyena male can move up in rank by killing a higher ranking male in confrontation, while the alpha female is usually just the oldest female in the clan. Emigration is common in brown hyena clans, particularly among young males, which will join other groups upon reaching adulthood.

Diet

Brown hyenas are primarily scavengers the bulk of whose diet consists of carcasses killed by larger predators, but they may supplement their diet with rodents, insects, eggs, fruit and fungi (the desert truffle Kalaharituber pfeilii). As they are poor hunters, live prey makes up only a small proportion of their diet: in the southern Kalahari, species such as springhare, springbok lambs, bat-eared foxes and korhaans constitute only 4.2% of their overall diet, while on the Namib coast, cape fur seal pups compose 2.9% of their food. They have an exceptional sense of smell and can locate carcasses kilometers away. They are aggressive kleptoparasites, frequently appropriating the kills of black-backed jackals, cheetahs and leopards. Single brown hyenas may charge at leopards with their jaws held wide open and can tree adult male leopards; they have been observed treeing leopards even when no kill was in contention. In the Kalahari Desert, they are often the dominant mammalian carnivores present because of this behavior and the relative scarcity of lions, spotted hyenas, and packs of African wild dogs. In areas where their territories overlap, brown hyenas may, on rare occasions, be killed by spotted hyenas and lions. Brown hyena cubs are also susceptible to being killed by wild dogs and jackals.

Reproduction and life cycle
The brown hyena does not have a mating season. Female brown hyenas are polyestrous and typically produce their first litter when they are two years old. They mate primarily from May to August. Males and females in the same clan usually do not mate with each other, rather females will mate with nomadic males. Clan males display no resistance to this behavior, and will assist the females in raising their cubs. Females give birth in dens, which are hidden in remote sand dunes far from the territories of spotted hyenas and lions. The gestation period is around 3 months. Mothers generally produce one litter every 20 months. Usually, only the dominant female breeds, but if two litters are born in the same clan, the mothers will nurse each other's cubs, though favoring their own. Litters usually consist of 1–5 cubs, which weigh  at birth. Unlike spotted hyenas, brown hyenas are born with their eyes closed, and open them after eight days. Cubs are weaned at 12 months and leave their dens after 18 months. Also unlike spotted hyenas, all adult members of the clan will carry food back to the cubs. They are not fully weaned and do not leave the vicinity of their den until they reach 14 months of age. Brown hyenas reach full size at an age of around 30 months and have a life span of about 12 to 15 years.

Threats and conservation status 
The global brown hyena population is estimated to comprise 4,000 to 10,000 individuals. It is listed as Near Threatened in the IUCN Red List. The major threat to the brown hyena is human persecution, based on the mistaken belief that it is harmful to livestock. Farmers find brown hyenas scavenging on livestock carcasses and wrongly assume that they have killed their property. Brown hyena body parts are also occasionally used for traditional medicines and rituals. The brown hyena is not in high demand for trophy hunting.

There are several conservation areas that are home to the brown hyena, including the Etosha National Park in Namibia, the Central Kalahari Game Reserve in Botswana and the Kgalagadi Transfrontier Park. The maintenance of these protected areas aids in the conservation of these animals. Educational campaigns are being utilized to promote awareness about hyenas and dispel prevailing myths, while problem individuals are removed from farmlands and urbanized areas.

References

External links 

IUCN Hyaenidae Specialist Group Brown Hyena pages
The Brown Hyena Research Project
Fossils of the Brown Hyena
Brown Hyena Images and Video – ARKive.org

brown hyena
Mammals of Southern Africa
Carnivorans of Africa
Mammals described in 1820